Hussain Al-Turki (born 28 May 1982) is a Saudi footballer who plays as a forward .

External links
 

1982 births
Living people
Saudi Arabian footballers
People from Qatif
Association football forwards
Khaleej FC players
Al-Ahli Saudi FC players
Al-Riyadh SC players
Saudi First Division League players
Saudi Professional League players
Saudi Arabian Shia Muslims